Knaben is an old mining village in the northern part of Kvinesdal municipality in Agder county, Norway. Currently, the mine is no longer in use, but the area has become a popular ski resort. The molybdenum mines were operated here from 1885 to 1973. Buildings and constructions are still partly intact. The workers' living houses are now used as tourist lodgings.

Nature 
The area has a rich bird-life and animal life, with moose, reindeer, black grouse, lagopus, falcon, and eagle.

Mining activity 
Occurrence of molybdenite was the basis for the mining activities at Knaben. In 1897, it was determined that tempering of steel with molybdenum resulted in an alloy with qualities favourable for weapon production. Due to low molybdenum prices the mining operations ceased in 1909. World War I led to an uprise at Knaben. At its height ten different mining companies had operations in the area, but all operations ceased when the war was over. The Swedish company Avesta Järnverks AB took over from A/S Knaben Molybdængruber, and the production increased through the 1930s, with about 400 mine workers and a total population at Knaben of about 700.

Second World War 

At the time Norway was invaded in 1940, during World War II, the Knaben mines were one of the only molybdenum mines in Europe still in operation. The occupying German forces stationed about 1,000 men in the area, and established gun sites for anti-aircraft guns. The mine operations were the target for allied bombing twice in 1943. The first attack took place on 3 March, with 10 British de Havilland Mosquito strike fighters of No. 139 Squadron RAF participating. The second attack was on 16 November, when 130 American B-17 bombers from the Eighth Air Force (in its mission number 131) attacked the Knaben molybdenum mines in a raid against Norway.

Post-war 
The school at Knaben was built in 1954. In 1973, the mining company announced it would cease operations. The mines were finally closed on 30 April 1973, and the village was more or less abandoned. A museum, Knaben Gruvemuseum has been established in the old administration building, and is run by Knabens Venner and Kvinesdal municipality. Norsk Bergverksmuseum is running a pilot project at the Knaben mining community.

A large sand deposit in the valley is a visible result from 88 years of mining activity. The percentage of molybdenum was low, on average below 0.2%. The sand deposits cause some leaching of metals (cadmium, copper and molybdenum), and flotation of chemicals into the river Kvina.

Today, tourism is the main activity at Knaben. There is an alpine ski resort in operation, and several mountain cabin resorts. The ski resort operates three different pistes of around 1,000m (3,280 ft) each, with an elevation of 182 m (597 ft).

Media gallery

References

Mining communities in Norway
Mining in Norway
Villages in Agder
Kvinesdal